"Hold Back the River" is a song by Scottish band Wet Wet Wet. It was released on 26 February 1990 as the third single from their third studio album, Holding Back the River (1989). The song peaked at number 31 on the UK Singles Chart and number 16 on the Irish Singles Chart.

Track listings
 CD and 12-inch
 "Hold Back the River" ― 4:48
 "Keys to Your Heart" (Original Demo) ― 4:15
 "With a Little Help from My Friends" (Live, Wembley Arena, 14th December 1989) ― 5:11

 7-inch and cassette
 "Hold Back the River" ― 4:48
 "Keys to Your Heart" (Original Demo) ― 4:15

 Limited-edition 12-inch
 "Hold Back the River" ― 4:48
 "Keys to Your Heart" (Original Demo) ― 4:15
 "Party City" ― 5:05
 "I Can Give You Everything" (Live, Wembley Arena, 14th December 1989) ― 5:25

Charts

References

Wet Wet Wet songs
1989 songs
1990 singles
Phonogram Records singles
Songs written by Graeme Clark (musician)
Songs written by Marti Pellow
Songs written by Neil Mitchell (musician)
Songs written by Tommy Cunningham